The Campeonato Pernambucano de Futebol (Pernambucan Football Championship, in English) is the football championship of Pernambuco state, Brazil, and is organized by the FPF.

The first edition of the Campeonato Pernambucano was played in 1915, and was won by Flamengo de Recife, a defunct club. In the 2023 season, 13 clubs will play for the title.

Clubs 
2023 Série A1
 Afogados
 Belo Jardim
 Caruaru City
 Central
 Íbis
 Maguary
 Náutico
 Petrolina
 Porto
 Retrô
 Salgueiro
 Santa Cruz
 Sport

List of champions

Titles by team

Teams in bold still active.

By city

Copa Pernambuco 
The Copa Pernambuco is a competition contested in the second semester of the year, by Pernambuco state teams.

List of champions

Titles by team 
5 titles
Santa Cruz
4 titles
Recife
3 titles
Sport
2 titles
Vitória-PE
1 title
Central, Náutico, Porto, Salgueiro and Ypiranga

See also 
 Campeonato Pernambucano (lower levels)

External links 
 FPF Official Website
RSSSF Historical Results, Pernambuco, Brasil - Contains full listings of the results of all Pernambucan championships.

 
Pernambucano